The flag of the United States territory of Guam was adopted on February 9, 1948. The territorial flag is dark blue with a narrow red border on all sides (border was a later addition). The red border represents the blood spilled in World War II and Spanish sovereignty. In the center of the flag is the seal; an almond-shaped emblem, which depicts a proa sailing in Hagåtña Bay near Hagåtña, and GUAM colored in red letters. The shape of the emblem recalls the slingshot stones used by ancient Chamorro people. The landform in the background depicts the Two Lovers Point cliff on Guam. Charles Alan Pownall, the military Governor of Guam, approved the flag's shape in 1948.

As a complement to the Guam flag design, and in response to Guam law providing for municipal flags, efforts were made to depict the culture of each Guam municipality on their own flag. These efforts to design 19 unique municipal flags were collaborated through the Mayors' Council with the assistance of illustrative artist Gerard Aflague, a Guam born native. These municipal flag designs reflect unique aspects of each of Guam's municipal villages.

Construction details
The length of the flag is forty inches and the width is seventy-eight inches. Around each side of the flag, there is a two-inch red border. The coat of arms in the center is twenty-four inches tall and sixteen inches wide.

Former flags

See also
Guam 
Seal of Guam
Flags of the U.S. states

References

External links

Municipal flags of Guam

Flags introduced in 1948
Flags of the insular areas of the United States
Flag
1948 establishments in Guam
Guam